Desulfococcus  is a Gram-negative, anaerobic and motile bacteria genus from the family of Desulfococcaceae.

References

Further reading

External links
Desulfococcus at MicrobeWiki

Bacteria genera
Desulfobacterales